Laurent Cadot (born 26 August 1983) is a French rower. He competed at the 2004 Summer Olympics and the 2008 Summer Olympics.

References

External links

1983 births
Living people
French male rowers
Olympic rowers of France
Rowers at the 2004 Summer Olympics
Rowers at the 2008 Summer Olympics
People from Aurillac
Sportspeople from Cantal
21st-century French people
World Rowing Championships medalists for France